This is a list of official state and territorial party organizations of the United States Democratic Party.

State and territorial organizations

References

See also
Democratic Party (United States) organizations
List of state parties of the Republican Party (United States)
List of state parties of the Libertarian Party (United States)

State parties